Youchao (lit. "Nest-Owner") is the inventor of houses and buildings, according to China's ancient mythology. He is said to have been one of The Three August Ones in ancient China. He is an obscure figure, also known as Da Chao. Tradition holds that he ruled over China for 200 years. According to Han Feizi, people could avoid harm from animals with the help of buildings made from wood, which was taught by Youchao.            

There is the legend of the Four Clans, who took part in creating the world. The four members are Youchao, Suiren, Fuxi, and Shennong.

References

Citations

Sources 

 Christie, Anthony (1968). Chinese Mythology. Feltham: Hamlyn Publishing. 
 Hawkes, David, translator and introduction (2011 [1985]). Qu Yuan et al., The Songs of the South: An Ancient Chinese Anthology of Poems by Qu Yuan and Other Poets. London: Penguin Books. 
 Yang, Lihui and Deming An, with Jessica Anderson Turner (2005). Handbook of Chinese Mythology. New York: Oxford University Press. 

Chinese deities
Legendary monarchs